The Canton of Mornant is a French administrative division, located in the Rhône department.

The canton was established by decree of 27 February 2014 which came into force in March 2015.

Composition 
The canton of Mornant is composed of 19 communes:

See also
Cantons of the Rhône department
Communes of the Rhône department

References

Cantons of Rhône (department)